Ljiljana (Cyrillic script: Љиљана) is a feminine given name. It may refer to:

Ljiljana Aranđelović (born 1963), Serbian politician and former presidential candidate in the Serbian presidential election, 2004
Ljiljana Blagojević (born 1955), actress
Ljiljana Buttler (1944–2010), singer born in former Yugoslavia
Ljiljana Čolić, Ph.D. (born 1956), former Minister for Education and Sport in the Government of Serbia
Ljiljana Crepajac (born 1931), Serbian classical scholar, philologist, a full-time professor at the University of Belgrade
Ljiljana Ljubisic, Canadian paralympic athlete
Ljiljana Zelen Karadžić (born 1945), the wife of the war crimes suspect and former Bosnian Serb leader Radovan Karadžić
Ljiljana Mugoša (born 1962), former Yugoslav handball player
Ljiljana Nikolovska (born 1964), singer of Croatian and Macedonian origin
Ljiljana Petrović (born 1939), singer
Ljiljana Raičević (born 1947), human rights and women's rights activist
Ljiljana Ranković (born 1993), Serbian volleyball player
Ljiljana Smajlović (born 1956), Serbian journalist
Ljiljana Vukajlović, Serbian pianist and accompanist

See also
 Liliana English form of Ljiljana

Slavic feminine given names
Serbian feminine given names